Erau or ERAU may refer to:

Erau, an Indonesian cultural festival
Embry–Riddle Aeronautical University, a university with campuses in Daytona Beach, Florida and Prescott, Arizona, United States
Eesti Raadioamatööride Ühing, an amateur radio organization in Estonia
Hérault, a department in Occitania, southern France
Hérault (river), a river flowing through the department